Pittsfield High School is a four year comprehensive public high school in Pittsfield, Massachusetts, United States. It serves the city of Pittsfield. The school dates its founding to 1844. It is administered by the Pittsfield Public Schools district and is the oldest of the district's two high schools. Enrollment for the 2014-2015 school year included 916 students. 51% of the student population was female and 49% were male. Students of African American, Asian, Hispanic, Native American, Native Hawaiian, Pacific Islander and Multi-Race, Non-Hispanic ethnicity and heritage comprised 21.8% percent of the student population.

History
Pittsfield High School (PHS) traces its founding to 1844 when a town meeting voted to establish the community's first high school. Six years later in November 1850, PHS opened in a three-room wooden building on a site occupied by the current city hall. Several sites and buildings later, the current facility opened on September 9, 1931.

Academics
Graduation requirements include: 1) earning 244 credits, 2) completing one of four certificate programs (Arts and Sciences, Business and Management Studies, Career/Technical Education or Work Based Learning) and 3) passing the Massachusetts Comprehensive Assessment System (MCAS) exam. The school's academic departments include Business, English, Fine and Performing Arts, Mathematics, Science, Social Studies, Special Education, Career Technical and World Languages.

Student life

Activities
PHS extracurricular activities include AfterSchool Social Club, Art Club, Band, Best Buddies, Cheerleading, Class Council, Computer Club, Mock Trial, Drama Club, Engineering Club, French Club, Italian Club, Latin Club, Literary Magazine, Orchestra, The Dome yearbook, Generally Speaking student newspaper, Gay Straight Alliance, Morningside/PHS Community Service Learning and Tutoring Project, National Honor Society, New England Math League, PHS/Williams Community Service Learning Project, PeaceJam, Pep Club, Photography Club, Quiz Team, SADD, Horticulture, Silk Screening Club, Spanish Club and Student Government.

Athletics
PHS fields varsity boys and girls athletic teams. The school is a member of the Berkshire County Conference athletic league. Member schools include Drury High School in North Adams, Hoosac Valley High School in Cheshire, Lee High School in Lee, Lenox Memorial High School in Lenox, Monument Mountain Regional High School in Great Barrington, Mt. Everett Regional High School in Sheffield, Mt. Greylock Regional High School in Williamstown, St. Joseph Central High School (Catholic) in Pittsfield, Taconic High School in Pittsfield and Wahconah Regional High School in Dalton. Each season both boys and girls PHS athletic teams play a few games against teams outside the league.

Notable alumni

 Elizabeth Banks, actress
 Mark Belanger, professional baseball player
 Kim Cobb, climate scientist
 Art Ditmar, professional baseball player
 Elaine Giftos, dancer and actress
 Alan Gionet, news anchor
 Tom Grieve, professional baseball player
 Rick Lisi, professional baseball player
 Robert Prentiss, Massachusetts and New York politician
 Joseph Scelsi, Massachusetts state legislator
 Niraj Shah, co-founder, co-chairman, and CEO of Wayfair
 Howie Storie, professional baseball player
 Matt Torra, professional baseball player
 Earl Turner, professional baseball player
 Charles White Whittlesey, MoH, lieutenant colonel in the United States Army

References

External links
Pittsfield Public Schools
iBerkshires.com - High School Sports

Public high schools in Massachusetts
Schools in Berkshire County, Massachusetts
Buildings and structures in Pittsfield, Massachusetts